O'Neill Peak is the highest point (about 850 m) of FitzGerald Bluffs, on the English Coast, Palmer Land. Following geological work in the area by a United States Geological Survey (USGS) field party in December 1984, named by Advisory Committee on Antarctic Names (US-ACAN) after John M. O'Neill, USGS geologist, a member of the field party.

Mountains of Palmer Land